Caspiohydrobia is a genus of gastropods belonging to the family Hydrobiidae.

The species of this genus are found in Caspian Sea.

Species:

Caspiohydrobia aralensis 
Caspiohydrobia behningi 
Caspiohydrobia bergi 
Caspiohydrobia borealis 
Caspiohydrobia carinata 
Caspiohydrobia chrysopsis 
Caspiohydrobia conica 
Caspiohydrobia coniformis 
Caspiohydrobia convexa 
Caspiohydrobia curta 
Caspiohydrobia cylindrica 
Caspiohydrobia dubia 
Caspiohydrobia eichwaldiana 
Caspiohydrobia eleganta 
Caspiohydrobia elongata 
Caspiohydrobia gemmata 
Caspiohydrobia husainovae 
Caspiohydrobia johanseni 
Caspiohydrobia kazakhstanica 
Caspiohydrobia ljaurica 
Caspiohydrobia nikitinskii 
Caspiohydrobia nikolskii 
Caspiohydrobia obrutchevi 
Caspiohydrobia oviformis 
Caspiohydrobia parva 
Caspiohydrobia pavlovskii 
Caspiohydrobia sidorovi 
Caspiohydrobia sogdiana 
Caspiohydrobia starobogatovi 
Caspiohydrobia subconvexa 
Caspiohydrobia tadzhikistanica 
Caspiohydrobia tamanensis 
Caspiohydrobia turrita

References

Hydrobiidae